Kyaw Zayar Win (Burmese: ကျော်ဇေယျာဝင်း; born 2 May 1991) is a former Burmese footballer who played as a winger.

Club career

Perak
Zayar Win started his career at Kanbawza (now Shan United) in the Myanmar National League before transferring to Malaysia Super League side Perak in November 2013 on a 1-year loan deal. However, an injury forced him out in April 2014.

Balestier Khalsa
After three years at Kanbawza and Ayeyawady United, Zayar Win went to Singapore to sign for Balestier Khalsa in February 2017, filling up the club's last foreign signing slot and joining his compatriots Nanda Lin Kyaw Chit and Aung Kyaw Naing, who had signed for the club days before him. He made his debut for the Tigers in a league match against Warriors FC on 28 February 2017. Although he won a penalty that led to the club's first goal, they eventually lost.

International career
Zayar Win represented Myanmar at the 2011 and 2013 Southeast Asian Games. At the latter edition on home soil, as captain and the only player in the Myanmar squad to play overseas, he scored in a 3–1 win against Timor-Leste from a free kick.

International goals
Scores and results list Myanmar's goal tally first.

References

1991 births
Living people
Burmese footballers
Myanmar international footballers
Burmese expatriate footballers
Expatriate footballers in Malaysia
Malaysia Super League players
Perak F.C. players
Ayeyawady United F.C. players
Association football forwards
Southeast Asian Games bronze medalists for Myanmar
Southeast Asian Games medalists in football
Competitors at the 2011 Southeast Asian Games
Competitors at the 2013 Southeast Asian Games